The Builders and The Butchers are a Folk Rock band based in Portland, Oregon, United States. It is fronted by singer/guitar player Ryan Sollee. The other members of the band are Willy Kunkle (bass guitar, vocals, percussion), Justin Baier (drums, backup vocals, percussion), Ray Rude (drums, piano, clarinet, backup vocals, percussion), and Harvey Tumbleson (mandolin, banjo, guitar, vocals, percussion).

The band's debut self-titled album was released in 2007 by Bladen County Records.

To date, the band has 6 full-length albums, 2 live album and 2 EP splits.

History 
The Builders and The Butchers formed on October 31, 2005. They came together because "a lot of bands were all breaking up around the same time, and we were looking to get into something new--so it just worked out." 

Each member is originally from Anchorage, Alaska and migrated separately to Portland, Oregon to start a career in music. 

Initially they called themselves "The Funeral Band", performing in the streets and outside of music venues. The name eventually changed to The Builders and The Butchers, "for no other reason than it was the only name all five members liked." The first year of acoustic performances were mostly street shows until opening for the experimental band Man Man in 2006. “We very slowly started plugging [our instruments] in.” Sollee says, but the group had to figure out how to utilize its two percussionists on stage. They found that by splitting one drum kit between Seely and Rude, with one handling the kick drum and another playing the snare, they developed what the group calls a “deconstructed” drumming style. 

The band's song-writing process involves Sollee writing the lyrics out and presenting it to the other members, who then start playing and putting the music around these lyrics.

In May 2008 the band won the Willamette Week’s “Best New Band of 2008” and Seattle Sound’s “Best Live Performers 2008”.

In late 2010, The Builders and the Butchers signed with Badman Recording Co. and released their third album, Dead Reckoning on February 22, 2011.

Artwork
The Builders and The Butchers' album artwork is produced by Portland, Oregon artist Lukas Ketner.

Members

Current
 Justin Baier (drums, backup vocals, percussion)
Willy Kunkle (bass guitar, vocals, percussion)
Ray Rude (drums, piano, clarinet, backup vocals, percussion)
Ryan Sollee (lead vocals, guitar, percussion)
Harvey Tumbleson (mandolin, banjo, guitar, vocals, percussion)

Former
Alex Ellis (bass guitar, vocals, percussion) - "The Builders and The Butchers", "Loch Lomond/The Builders and The Butchers" 12-inch Split, "Salvation is a Deep Dark Well","Dead Reckoning"
Brandon Hafer (drums, trumpet, melodica, backup vocals, percussion)
Adrienne Hatkin (mandolin, banjo, accordion, vocals, percussion) - live shows
Paul Seely (drums, trumpet, melodica, backup vocals, percussion) - "The Builders and The Butchers", "Loch Lomond/The Builders and The Butchers" 12-inch Split, "Salvation is a Deep Dark Well"

Guests
Annalisa Tornfelt (violin, backup vocals) for "The Builders and The Butchers", "Loch Lomond/The Builders and The Butchers" 12-inch Split, "Salvation is a Deep Dark Well"
Emily Tornfelt (cello) for "Salvation is a Deep Dark Well"
Tyler Tornfelt (cello) for "Loch Lomond/The Builders and The Butchers" 12-inch Split
Skip Von Kuske (cello) for "Loch Lomond/The Builders and The Butchers" 12-inch Split
Douglas Jenkins (cello) for "Salvation is a Deep Dark Well"
Justin Kagen (cello) for "Salvation is a Deep Dark Well"
Joe Bowden (backup vocals) for "Salvation is a Deep Dark Well"
Sean Flynn (backup vocals) for "Salvation is a Deep Dark Well"
Jesse Bettis (backup vocals) for "Salvation is a Deep Dark Well"
Scott Magee (bass clarinet, backup vocals) for "Salvation is a Deep Dark Well"
Sebastian Bibb Barrett (trumpet) for "Salvation is a Deep Dark Well"
Victor Nash (trumpet, french horn) for "Salvation is a Deep Dark Well"
Amanda Lawrence (viola) for "Salvation is a Deep Dark Well"
Chris Funk ([backup vocals]) for "Salvation is a Deep Dark Well"
Mike Anzalone (castanets, backup vocals)for "Loch Lomond/The Builders and The Butchers" 12-inch Split, "Salvation is a Deep Dark Well"
The Flash Choir for "Salvation is a Deep Dark Well"
The Gospel Choir for "Salvation is a Deep Dark Well"
The Portland Cello Project - live shows

Discography

Albums

References

External links
 Official The Builders and The Butchers Sites: Website· YouTube · Twitter · MySpace · Facebook

2005 establishments in Oregon
Indie rock musical groups from Oregon
Musical groups established in 2005
Musical groups from Portland, Oregon